The following is a list of English-speaking Quebecers.

A
Tony Abbott (born 1930), lawyer and politician
Douglas Abbott (1899–1987), politician
John Abbott (1821–1893), Prime Minister of Canada
Maude Abbott (1869–1940), physician and scientist
Elie Abel (1920–2004), journalist and author
Mark Abley (born 1955), poet, journalist and author
Marianne Ackerman (born 1952), novelist, playwright and journalist
Frank Dawson Adams (1859–1942), geologist
Willis Adcock (1922–2003), physical chemist, electrical engineer and university professor
Ben Addelman, film director
Paul Adey (born 1963), hockey player and coach
John Aird (1885–1938), banker
George Oscar Alcorn (1850–1930), lawyer and politician
H. Montagu Allan
Hugh Allan
Moyra Allen
Sid Altman (1939–2022), biophysicist, Nobel Prize winner
Melissa Altro (born 1982), actress, voice actress
Jasey-Jay Anderson (born 1975), snowboarder and Olympic gold medalist
Joel Anthony (born 1982), basketball player
Alex Anthopoulos (born 1977), baseball general manager
Michael Applebaum (born 1963), interim mayor of Montreal
April Wine (1969), rock band
Melissa Auf der Maur (born 1972), vocalist and musician
Nick Auf der Maur (1942–1998), journalist and politician

B
Matthew Barnaby (born 1973), hockey player and sports analyst
Jay Baruchel (born 1982), actor
Daniel Bayne (c.1730–1769), trader
Joe Beef (1835–1889), tavern owner
Tanith Belbin (born 1984), ice dancer
Saul Bellow (1915–2005), author, Nobel Prize winner
Tyrone Benskin
William Ian Corneil Binnie (born 1939), jurist
Conrad Black (born 1944), entrepreneur
Mike Bossy (born 1957), hockey player
Scotty Bowman, National Hockey League coach and executive
Bowser and Blue, musical comedy and satire duo
Justin Bradley
Charles Bronfman (born 1931), philanthropist
Edgar Bronfman, Sr. (born 1929–2013), philanthropist
Samuel Bronfman, philanthropist
Wally Buono
Pat Burns
Craig Button

C
Dayana Cadeau, Haitian-born Canadian American professional bodybuilder
Donald J. Carty (born 1946), airline executive
Thomas Cleeve (1844–1908), entrepreneur
Leonard Cohen (1934–2016), poet, songwriter
Steven Crowder, conservative political commentator on YouTube
Corey Crawford (born 1984), hockey player
Peter Cullen (born 1941), voice actor
Elisha Cuthbert (born 1982), actress

D
Sir Mortimer B. Davis, philanthropist
Colleen Dewhurst (1924–1991), stage and film actress
Ivan Doroschuk (born 1957), musician
Bruce Dowbiggin, journalist and sportscaster
Ian Dowbiggin, University of Prince Edward Island professor

E
Edith Maude Eaton (1865–1914), author
Winnifred Eaton (1875–1954), author
Vic Emery, Olympic bobsleigh gold medalist

F
Don Ferguson (born 1946), actor, scriptwriter, comedian
Reginald Fessenden (1866–1932), inventor, "father of radio broadcasting"
Glenn Ford (1916–2006), actor

Mitch Garber (born 1964), businessman, philanthropist 
Huntley Gordon (1887–1956), actor
Bruce Greenwood (born 1957), actor

H
Corey Hart (born 1962), musician
Doug Harvey (1924–1989), ice hockey player
Prudence Heward (1896–1947), painter

J
Nicole Jaffe (born 1941), talent agent, actress
Emmett Johns (1928–2018), priest, founder of Dans la Rue
Oliver Jones (born 1934), jazz pianist

K
Jonah Keri (born 1974), journalist, author
Andy Kim (born 1946), singer
Naomi Klein (born 1970), journalist, author

L
Jon Lajoie  (born 1980), comedian
Dane Lanken (born 1945), journalist
Irving Layton (1912–2006), poet
Jack Layton (1950–2011), politician
Giselle Lazzarato (born 1992), model, actress, internet personality
Vanessa Lengies (born 1985), actor
Jaclyn Linetsky (1986–2003), actress
William Edmond Logan (1798–1875), geologist
Kevin Lowe (born 1959), ice hockey player
John Lynch-Staunton (1930–2012), businessman, statesman

M
Norm Macdonald (1959–2021), comedian, actor
Robert MacNeil (born 1931), journalist, author
Rudolph A. Marcus (born 1923), scientist, 1992 Nobel Prize in Chemistry
Bat Masterson (1853–1921), gunfighter, journalist
Anna McGarrigle (born 1944), singer-songwriter
Kate McGarrigle (born 1946), singer-songwriter
James McGill (1744–1813), businessman
Stuart McLean (born 1948), journalist, broadcaster, storyteller, author
Gerry McNeil (1926–2004), ice hockey player
Torrey Mitchell, National Hockey League (2007-present)
Hartland Molson, brewer, sportsman, statesman
John Molson (1763–1836), brewer
Dickie Moore (1931–2015), ice hockey player
Terry Mosher (born 1942), caricaturist
Brian Mulroney (born 1939), Prime Minister of Canada

N
Percy Erskine Nobbs (1875–1964), architect

O
Kevin Owens (born 1984), born Kevin Steen, professional wrestler

P
Wilder Penfield (1891–1976), neurosurgeon, medical scientist
Louise Penny (born 1958), novelist
Oscar Peterson (1925–2007), jazz pianist
Steven Pinker (born 1954), cognitive scientist, author
 Conrad Poirier (1912–1968), photojournalist
Juliette Powell (born 1974), journalist, television personality

R
Caroline Rhea (born 1964), actress, comedian
Mordecai Richler (1931–2001), author
Sam Roberts (born 1974), singer
Witold Rybczynski (born 1943), architect, professor and author

S
Mort Sahl (1927–2021), comedian
Anne Savage (1896–1971), painter
Mack Sennett (1880–1960), film director/producer
William Shatner (born 1931), actor
Douglas Shearer (1899–1971), film sound engineer
Norma Shearer (1902–1983), actress
Denis Stairs, Chairman, Montreal Engineering Co.
Amanda Stepto (born 1970), actress
Mark Steyn, writer
Victor Suthren (born 1942), writer

T
Donald Tarlton, record producer, promoter
 Venus Terzo, voice artist, famous for X-Men: Evolution

W
Rufus Wainwright (born 1973), singer-songwriter
Bill Wennington, former basketball player
Lucille Wheeler (born 1935), alpine ski champion
Cairine Wilson (1885–1962), stateswoman, humanitarian
Joseph Wiseman (1918–2009), actor

+
Lists of people by language
English-speaking